Lerista baynesi, also known commonly as Baynes' lerista and Bayne's slider,  is a species of skink, a lizard in the family Scincidae. The species is endemic to Australia.

Etymology
The specific name, baynesi, is in honor of Alexander Baynes (born 1944), who is an Australian mammalogist and paleontologist.

Geographic range
L. baynesi is found in the Australian states of South Australia and Western Australia.

Habitat
The preferred natural habitats of L. baynesi are savanna and shrubland.

Description
L. baynesi has no front legs, and very small hind legs. Each hind leg has two toes.

Reproduction
L. baynesi is oviparous.

References

Further reading
Cogger HG (2014). Reptiles and Amphibians of Australia, Seventh Edition. Clayton, Victoria, Australia: CSIRO Publishing. xxx + 1,033 pp. .
Storr GM (1971). "The genus Lerista (Lacertilia: Scincidae) in Western Australia". Journal of the Royal Society of Western Australia 54: 59–75. (Lerista picturata baynesi, new subspecies).
Storr GM (1991). "Revision of Lerista picturata (Lacertilia: Scincidae) of southern Australia". Records of the Western Australian Museum 15 (3): 529–534. (Lerista baynesi, new status).
Wilson S, Swan G (2013). A Complete Guide to Reptiles of Australia, Fourth Edition. Sydney: New Holland Publishers. 522 pp. .

Lerista
Reptiles described in 1971
Taxa named by Glen Milton Storr
Hampton bioregion